HMS Rorqual has been the name of two Royal Navy submarines.  A rorqual is a type of whale:

 , a Grampus-class submarine launched in 1936
 , a Porpoise-class submarine launched in 1956

References

Royal Navy ship names